Cris Ortega (born 1980) is a Spanish painter, writer, and comics artist. Her style is a mixture of realism and manga, a somewhat dark semi-realism. Forgotten, one of her principal works, combines gothic and romantic elements, as well as a mixture of horror and fantasy.

Biography
Cris Ortega became interested in art and literature in childhood, specifically in the horror genre. In 1999 she created her first comic from a story she had written several years before.

She entered the higher technical degree program in illustration at the Art School of Valladolid. While attending, she began to publish in local and foreign magazines. At that time she also worked as a drawing teacher and presented her works at various exhibitions and art galleries. At the end of her studies, Ortega worked for the first time as an art director for an advertising agency named Sm2, while continuing with illustration. She devoted all her free time to creating book covers and publishing the comic book anthology Shade. During those years she worked in graphic design, advertising, figurine design, role-playing games, video games, and comics. Always anchored in the world of fantasy and terror, she was also clearly influenced by manga. The influence of anime can also be seen in her illustrations.

In 2005, she began working as an illustrator for Norma Editorial, remaining with them for a year and a half. She then published her first series of collections of images associated with stories, including Forgotten. In 2007, the first volume of Forgotten was published in Spain. It would subsequently be translated into several languages, such as French, English, Italian, and German. Forgotten consists of four stories that combine Gothic and romantic elements.

Works

Books
 Forgotten 1: El Reino sin nombre, Norma, 2007; containing: "El alma de la araña", "Rosa salvaje", "La caja de música", and "El canto de Lorelei", 
 Forgotten 2: El portal de los destinos, Norma, 2008; containing: "Melodía espectral", "El grito de la Banshee", "Cartas en la oscuridad", and "La Rosa de los Vientos", 
 Forgotten 3: Las Colinas del Silencio, Norma, 2010; containing: "El Cortejo de las Ánimas", "Cuando llegue diciembre", "La alianza de coral", and "El manantial de la luna", 
 Nocturna, Imagica, 2011, 
 Reflejos, compilation, 2014,

Collaborations
 Exotique, Ballistic Publishing, 2005
 In Dark Alleys, (Brian St. Claire-King), Vajra Entreprises, 2006
 Exotique 2, Ballistic Publishing, 2006
 Shade, (Lia Fiengo, Cris Ortega, Studio Kawaii, Hokane, Van Duran, Maria Abagnale, Ruui Eyvm), 2005
 Spectrum 14, Underwood Books, 2007
 Solidary King Kong, Scfiworld, 2008
 Exotique4, Ballistic Publishing, 2008
 Ecos de Azurëa volume 1, (Manuel F. Bueno), Mundos Épicos, 2009
 Exotique 5, Ballistic Publishing, 2009
 Spectrum 16, Underwood Books, 2009
 Woman in the shadow, 2009
 Drakaina Masters, SPQP artbook, 2010
 Art Squared digital painters 2, Rage Publishing, 2010
 Vampires The illustrated world of darkness, Norma, 2010
 Spectrum 18, Underwood Books, 2011
 Exotique 7, (Mario Wisibono), Ballistic Publishing, 2011
 Donde los árboles cantan (Laura Gallego), SM, 2011
 Chopper 1, (Martin Chapiro, Juan Ferreyra) Asylum Press, 2011
 TBO 4 Japon, Dibbuks, 2011
 D'artiste character design, Ballistic Publishing, 2011
 Allia 6, 2011
 Crónicas de sombras.

References

External links
 

1980 births
21st-century Spanish women writers
21st-century Spanish writers
Painters from Castile and León
Living people
People from Valladolid
Spanish cartoonists
Spanish comics writers
Spanish women painters
Spanish women cartoonists